Antonio Iriondo Ortega (born 3 November 1953) is a Spanish retired footballer who played as a midfielder, and is the current manager of Atlético Sanluqueño CF. He has managed teams such as Rayo Vallecano, CD San Fernando and Rayo Majadahonda in Spain.

Playing career
Born in Moscow to Spanish parents that, while still children, had been sent to Russia in 1937 due to the Spanish Civil War, Iriondo returned to Spain in 1957 at the age of four. He only played lower league football during his whole career, representing CDC Moscardó, CP Amorós, RCD Carabanchel, AD Alcorcón, Valdemoro CF and Tomelloso CF, retiring with the latter in 1982 at the age of 28.

Managerial career
Iriondo started his managerial career at AD Villaviciosa de Odón in the regional leagues, and moved to CD Móstoles in 1991. He subsequently managed lower league sides in the Community of Madrid, notably CF Rayo Majadahonda for two different spells, where he achieved promotion to Segunda División B in his third season.

Iriondo subsequently managed CD Manchego before being appointed Rayo Vallecano B manager in 2002. On 14 April 2003, he replaced fired Gustavo Benítez at the helm of the main squad in La Liga.

Iriondo remained in charge for nine matches, suffering relegation as dead last. After returning to the B-side in July 2003, he was named UD San Sebastián de los Reyes manager the following February.

Subsequently, Iriondo was appointed at the helm of CD Toledo (two stints), CD San Fernando, San Fernando CD (two stints) and Rayo Majadahonda. With the latter he achieved promotion to the third division in 2015, and took the clubs to the play-offs for the first time in their history in 2017.

On 27 May 2018, Iriondo achieved promotion to Segunda División with the Majariegos, after beating FC Cartagena in the play-offs. On 11 June of the following year, after suffering relegation, he resigned.

On 26 July 2019, Iriondo was named manager of Indian Super League side Jamshedpur FC. After missing the playoffs in his one year at the Tata Steel-owned franchise, he returned to Majadahonda on a one-season deal with the option of a second.

Managerial statistics

References

External links

1953 births
Living people
Footballers from Moscow
Exiles of the Spanish Civil War in the Soviet Union
Russian footballers
Spanish footballers
Association football midfielders
Tercera División players
Divisiones Regionales de Fútbol players
Atlético Madrid C players
AD Alcorcón footballers
Spanish football managers
La Liga managers
Segunda División managers
Primera Federación managers
Segunda División B managers
Tercera División managers
CF Rayo Majadahonda managers
Rayo Vallecano managers
CD Toledo managers
Spanish expatriate football managers
Spanish expatriate sportspeople in India
Expatriate football managers in India
Spanish people of Basque descent
Jamshedpur FC managers